Yengijeh; also Romanized as Yengījeh; also known as Yengejeh is a village in Behi-e Feyzolah Beygi Rural District of the Central District of Bukan County, West Azerbaijan province, Iran. At the 2006 National Census, its population was 444 in 73 households. The following census in 2011 counted 1,057 people in 270 households. The latest census in 2016 showed a population of 1,689 people in 478 households; it was the largest village in its rural district.

References 

Bukan County

Populated places in West Azerbaijan Province

Populated places in Bukan County